This article is a list of the emergency and first responder agencies that responded to the September 11 attacks against the United States, on September 11, 2001.
These agencies responded during and after the attack and were part of the search-and-rescue, security, firefighting, clean-up, investigation, evacuation, support and traffic control on September 11.

World Trade Center, New York City, September 11
This list is a list of emergency services, first responder agencies and organisations that responded to the terrorist attack at the original World Trade Center in New York City.

Law enforcement agencies

At least 10 law enforcement agencies responded to the terrorist attacks at the WTC. 
There were many losses, from these agencies:
One officer was killed when United Flight 93 crashed into a field in Shanksville, Pennsylvania
71 officers were killed when the two WTC buildings collapsed 
Hundreds more have passed away in the years following 2001 as the direct result of illnesses contracted while working in hazardous conditions in New York, Pennsylvania, and Virginia.

This is a list of the law enforcement agencies (Federal, State and Local) that responded on 9/11.

New York State and City agencies
New York City Parks Enforcement Patrol (PEP) - The PEP responded with several officers and assisted with traffic control, manning checkpoints and escorting people out of the area.
New York City Police Department (NYPD) - the NYPD was one of the major first responders and lost twenty-three officers on the day.
New York City Sheriff - large response by the NYC Sheriff, who helped with evacuations, traffic control and scene control
Port Authority Police Department (PAPD) - the WTC was owned by the Port Authority and had a large PAPD presence on the day - thirty-seven members of the PAPD were lost on the day. 
New York City Department of Corrections (NYCD) - ESU officers responded to the WTC.
New York State Court Officers - NY State Court Officers responded and helped with evacuations at the WTC. Three officers were lost on the day.
New York State Police (NYSP) - Troopers from the NYSP responded on 9/11, including elements of the Mobile Response Team / SWAT & K9 teams.
American Society for the Prevention of Cruelty to Animals Humane Law Enforcement, New York (ASPCA) - Special Investigators from the ASPCA's Humane Law Enforcement division were assigned to search for abandoned animals in homes and apartments in restricted area around the World Trade Center site that had been evacuated. One investigator died later after the attacks.
 New York City Department of Sanitation Environmental Police - responded and assisted at the WTC attacks.

Federal Law Enforcement agencies
Federal Bureau of Investigation (FBI) - Assisted with evacuation, search and rescue, recovery and led the criminal investigation into the September 11 attacks.
US Customs Service - The US Customs Service had a post of 760 officers at the US Customs House in WTC Tower 6 and officers responded to the attacks.
US Postal Inspection Service (USPIS) - US Postal Inspectors helped with the recovery efforts and removed the mail from nearby US Post Office to safety.
US Secret Service (USSS) - assisted with rescue efforts and site control. One Special Agent was based at the World Trade Center field office and died on 9/11.
Bureau of Alcohol, Tobacco, Firearms and Explosives (ATF) - Bureau of Alcohol, Tobacco, Firearms and Explosives arrived shortly after the south tower collapsed and assisted in the evacuation of civilians.
United States Marshals Service (USMS) - Assisted with evacuation and emergency response on 9/11.
Federal Protective Service (FPS) (when part of the GSA) responded to the attack and helped with evacuation and emergency response.

Fire, Rescue agencies

New York City Fire Department (FDNY) - massive response from FDNY. The Department lost 343 members on 9/11. 
New York Fire Patrol (FPNY) - the New York [City] Fire Patrol responded with members assisting the FDNY with rescue and recovery. The Patrol lost 1 member on 9/11.
Indiana Rescue Task Force - deployed the Indiana Task Force 1 (ITF-1), which were a group of firefighters from various Indiana Fire/Rescue departments and agencies. They arrived on September 12.
Arundel Volunteer Fire Department - responded from Maryland to assist with rescue and recovery
Islip Volunteer Fire Department (Suffolk County, New York) - Sent one Tactical Rescue Unit to New York City to assist with rescue and recovery.
Hauppauge Fire Department, NY - provided mutual aid support to the recovery efforts. Lost two members on 9/11.
West Hamilton Beach Fire Department - volunteer fire department, NYC
Broad Channel Volunteer Fire Department - volunteer fire department, NYC
Edgewater Park Volunteer Hose Company - volunteer fire department, NYC
Richmond Engine Company #1 -volunteer fire department, NYC
Oceanic Hook and Ladder Company #1 volunteer fire department, NYC
Aviation Volunteer Hose Co. #3 - volunteer fire department, NYC (disbanded)
Jersey City Fire Department Only NJ Fire Department that received an official call for help from the FDNY.
Newark Fire Department Newark Firefighters went to the scene via a Police Athletic League Bus and a Ferry despite direct orders from Dispatchers that any Firefighter who stepped foot in Manhattan would be terminated.

Emergency Medical Services  (EMS)
Many different emergency medical services responded to the WTC. Some of these agencies are listed below:

FDNY EMS responded, as part of the FDNY (see below)
Brighton Volunteer Ambulance
New York Presbyterian Emergency Medical Services - lost 2 members on 9/11.
Central Park Medical Unit Volunteer Ambulance
Hatzolah volunteer Ambulance
Maimonides Medical Center Emergency Medical Services
Cabrini Hospital Emergency Medical Services (NYC) - lost 1 member on 9/11.
Forest Hills Volunteer Ambulance Corps (NYC) - lost 1 member on 9/11.
MetroCare Ambulance - lost 1 member on 9/11.
Hunter Ambulance - lost 1 member on 9/11/
Bellmore-Merrick Emergency Medical Services - a volunteer EMS from Bellmore, New York
Jersey City Medical Center (NJ) - lost 1 member on 9/11.
Teaneck Volunteer Ambulance Corps- a volunteer EMS agency from Teaneck, New Jersey
Saint Vincent's Catholic Medical Centers (SVCMC) - sent ambulances to the WTC and acted as the primary admitting hospital for the injured.
Citywide Ambulance

Military and Federal Government agencies

New York Air National Guard - The NY Air Guard had jets deployed over NYC after the attacks and Air Guard airmen were already staffing at the North East Air Defense Sector.
New York National Guard - helped secure the scene after the attack, with the Guard manning cordons and assisting at 'the Pile'.
United States Coast Guard - responded with a maritime evacuation, provided communications and security, assisted those in need. Operation Noble Eagle - deployed even more Coast Guard men and women on port security missions, search and rescue efforts, and clean-up operations. Thousands of Coast Guard Auxiliarists and reservists were mobilized in homeland defense and port security.
249th Engineer Battalion (Prime Power), United States Army Corps of Engineers, U.S. Army - deployed a Patrol Boat to help with rescue/recovery and helped restore power to Wall Street.

See also
Rescue and recovery effort after the September 11 attacks on the World Trade Center

References

September 11 attacks